Rollinia pachyantha is a species of plant in the Annonaceae family. It is endemic to Colombia.

References

pachyantha
Endemic flora of Colombia
Endangered plants
Endangered biota of South America
Taxonomy articles created by Polbot
Taxobox binomials not recognized by IUCN